While Justice Waits is a 1922 American silent Western film directed by Bernard J. Durning, and starring Dustin Farnum, Irene Rich, Earl Metcalfe, Junior Delameter, and Frankie Lee. The film was released by Fox Film Corporation on November 19, 1922.

Cast
 Dustin Farnum as Dan Hunt
 Irene Rich as Nell Hunt
 Earl Metcalfe as George Carter
 Junior Delameter as Hunt Jr.
 Frankie Lee as Joe
 Hector V. Sarno as A Man
 Peaches Jackson as A Man's Daughter
 Gretchen Hartman as Mollie Adams

Preservation
The film is now considered lost.

References

External links

 
 

1922 Western (genre) films
1922 films
American black-and-white films
Lost American films
Fox Film films
Lost Western (genre) films
1922 lost films
Silent American Western (genre) films
Films directed by Bernard Durning
1920s American films
1920s English-language films